The Jaysh al-Nukhba (Elite Army, formerly called the Liberation Army (: Jaysh al-Tahrir) is a group operating in the Hama and Aleppo Governorates, backed and supported by Turkey. The group was formed from five units, some of which received BGM-71 TOW missiles from the United States.

History

Liberation Army
In July 2016 the al-Nusra Front raided the Liberation Army's headquarters in Kafr Nabl and captured 40 fighters, including the group's commander, Mohammed al-Ghabi. They also seized a number of weapons.

The group participated in the Turkish military intervention in Syria which began with the capture of Jarabulus. Liberation Army fighters captured the village of Amarnah from the Syrian Democratic Forces and took more than 8 SDF fighters captive. Since October 2016, the Liberation Army operates a prisoner-of-war camp in the northern Aleppo Governorate, which holds around 300 prisoners of war from the Islamic State of Iraq and the Levant, implementing Sharia and capital punishment. On 15 October, Mohammed al-Ghabi was severely injured by an ISIL car bombs and died 20 days later. A new commander was named on 10 November.

Elite Army
On 7 January 2017, the Liberation Army announced that it has changed its name to the Elite Army and a new commander was appointed.

After internal disputes within the group in early 2017, the 46th, 312th, and 314th Divisions left the Elite Army and formed a new group called the 2nd Army.

In May 2018, along with 10 other rebel groups in northwestern Syria, the Elite Army formed the National Front for Liberation, which was officially announced on 28 May.

In September 2021 one of the group members kidnapped a 16 year old girl just as she was released from a prison (converted from "the former Asayish Center" post Turkish occupation) on 23 May 2020. She was taken to the Idlib Governorate where she stated that he enslaved her similar to ISIS has done previously.

References

External links
Youtube channel (no longer available)
Twitter account

Anti-government factions of the Syrian civil war
Free Syrian Army
Anti-ISIL factions in Syria
Turkish supported militant groups of the Syrian civil war